Faust Wakes Nosferatu are two 1997 albums by the German krautrock group Faust.

The CD and vinyl editions contain completely different music and have different covers.

Track listing
CD version 
 "Ausbruch Nach Rumanien" – 21.53	
 "Verwirrung" – 18.20	
 "Telepathia" – 6.44	
 "Kampf der Machte" – 5.27	
 "Das Unheil breitet sich aus" – 12.05	
 "Die Entscheidung" – 7.30

Vinyl version 

Side A
 "Abgründe" – 4:44	
 "Reise" – 8:09	
 "Ellen (Cry For)" – 0:34	
 "Wehmut Und Ekstase" – 4:57	

Side B
 "Visions" – 7:02	
 "Sog" – 1:48	
 "Todesschiff" – 8:56

References

External links
 at faust-pages.com.

1997 albums
Faust (band) albums